Ballyrory is a small village  and townland (of 426 acres) in County Londonderry, Northern Ireland. It is situated in the civil parish of Cumber Upper and the historic barony of Tirkeeran.

It had a population of 68 people (25 households) in the 2011 Census. It is situated within Derry and Strabane district.

See also 
List of towns and villages in Northern Ireland
List of townlands in County Londonderry

References 

Villages in County Londonderry
Townlands of County Londonderry
Civil parish of Cumber Upper
Derry and Strabane district